Hyëna is the 22nd studio album by German industrial rock band KMFDM, released on September 9, 2022. Due to the release of the prior album Paradise in September 2019, the time between Paradise and Hyëna represents the longest gap between KMFDM albums since their formation (at nearly three years).

Critical reception 
Hyena has received very favorable reviews from critics.

Neil Z. Yeung of AllMusic said of the album, "KMFDM keeps listeners on their toes with this energized burst of power, winking humor, and their always-reliable trademark sound."
Johann Carlsson of Release Music Magazine stated that the album is "driven by the vicious and virulent vocal onslaught of founder Sascha ‘Käpt’n K’ Konietzko and Lucia Cifarelli, the aural and angular guitar wizardry of Andee Blacksugar, and the forceful percussive thrust of Andy Selway".

John Deaux of All About the Rock stated that Hyëna "blasts through the speakers with the force of a napalm airstrike".

Alexandra Kozicki of MXDWN commented that "The album takes on a more aggressive tone, with heavy instrumentals and lyrics that call out those in power".

Tour
KMFDM toured North America in September and October of 2022 in support of the album.

Track listing

References 

2022 albums
KMFDM albums